Lieutenant-General Sir Donald Kenneth McLeod   (19 June 1885 – 25 October 1958) was a British Indian Army officer.

Military career
McLeod was commissioned into the Indian Army on 29 November 1904. He earned recognition with his appointment as a companion of the Distinguished Service Order in the 1917 New Year Honours during the First World War.

He became commanding officer Guides Cavalry in India in 1928, commander of the 4th (Secunderabad) Cavalry Brigade in 1933 and commander of the 1st (Risalpur) Cavalry Brigade in 1934. He went on to be Deputy Adjutant and Quartermaster General, Northern Command, India in 1937 and, having been appointed a Companion of the Order of the Bath on 11 May 1937, he became General Officer Commanding Burma Command in January 1939 before retiring in 1942.

He was appointed a Knight Commander of the Order of the Indian Empire in the 1942 New Year Honours.

He became a Deputy Lieutenant for Inverness-shire in 1955.

References

Bibliography

1885 births
1958 deaths
British Indian Army generals
Indian Army personnel of World War I
Indian Army generals of World War II
Graduates of the Staff College, Camberley
Graduates of the Royal College of Defence Studies
People educated at Wellington College, Berkshire
Graduates of the Royal Military College, Sandhurst
Knights Commander of the Order of the Indian Empire
Companions of the Order of the Bath
Companions of the Distinguished Service Order
Deputy Lieutenants of Inverness-shire